How Wonderful! is a 1989 TV movie about a journalist who falls pregnant.

References

External links

Australian television films
1989 television films
1989 films
1980s pregnancy films
Australian pregnancy films
1980s English-language films